Šimon Štefanec (born 5 September 1998) is a Slovak footballer who plays as an attacking-midfielder for FC Petržalka.

Club career
Štefanec made his professional Fortuna Liga debut for Nitra against Ružomberok on 9 March 2019. Štefanec came on as a replacement for Ján Chovanec ten minutes before the end. Nitra kept the clean sheet and collected a point for a goal-less tie.

References

External links
 FC Nitra official club profile 
 Futbalnet profile 
 
 

1998 births
Living people
Sportspeople from Žilina
Slovak footballers
Slovak expatriate footballers
Slovakia youth international footballers
Association football midfielders
Hellas Verona F.C. players
S.S. Arezzo players
FC Nitra players
MŠK Púchov players
FC Petržalka players
Slovak Super Liga players
2. Liga (Slovakia) players
Expatriate footballers in Italy
Slovak expatriate sportspeople in Italy